Pantydia metaphaea is a species of moth of the family Erebidae. It is found in Sri Lanka, the Philippines, Borneo, Sumatra and Australia, where it has been recorded from Queensland.

References

Moths described in 1912
Pantydia
Moths of Asia
Moths of Australia